The Senate Liberal Caucus, also known as the Senate Liberals, was, from 2014 to 2019, a parliamentary grouping in the Senate of Canada made up of independent senators who were individually members of the Liberal Party of Canada and were appointed on the advice of previous Liberal prime ministers. The caucus was not formally affiliated to or recognized by the Liberal Party.

The caucus was dissolved on November 14, 2019 and its members formed a new non-partisan parliamentary group, the Progressive Senate Group. The dissolution of the Senate Liberals marked the first time the Senate of Canada had no Liberal members since Canadian Confederation in 1867.

History
Historically, Liberal senators were part of the national Liberal Party parliamentary caucus, alongside MPs; this changed on January 29, 2014, when party leader Justin Trudeau expelled all 32 senators from the caucus. The expulsion came as part of Trudeau's proposal for a non-partisan Senate, arguing that "the party structure within the Senate interferes with [their] responsibilities," and said the remaining Liberal senators would have no formal ties to the Liberal Party machinery. The move came as a surprise to the Liberal senators, who were not informed the decision ahead of time. Although Trudeau said that they would now sit as independents, the 32 senators chose to keep the designation "Liberal" and continue to sit together as a caucus, formally called the "Senate Liberal Caucus". Jim Cowan, the former leader of the Liberal Party in the Senate, remained the leader of his Liberal colleagues, and continued to be recognized as the Leader of the Opposition in the Senate. According to Cowan, the only change would be that they "will not need to be concerned any more about the real or perceived direction from the national Liberal caucus."

Unlike previous practice in which the Liberal leaders in the Senate were appointed by the leader of the Liberal Party of Canada, the leader of the Senate Liberal Caucus was directly elected by Liberal senators. When the Liberal Party under Trudeau formed the government following the 2015 federal election, contrary to previous practice, the Senate Liberals did not become the government caucus in the Senate. Instead, Trudeau appointed a non-affiliated senator to be the Representative of the Government in the Senate. After 2015, several senators left the caucus and redesignated themselves as non-affiliated senators or joined the Independent Senators Group.

By 2019, redesignations and retirements had reduced the Senate Liberal Caucus to nine members. As a minimum of nine members is required for official caucus status, which entitles the grouping to access to funding for a research budget and other supports and privileges, the Senate Liberals were expected to lose their status as an official Senate caucus on January 24, 2020, when the mandatory retirement of Senator Joseph A. Day would have reduced the caucus to eight. Additionally, senators Serge Joyal and Lillian Dyck were set to retire from the Senate on February 1, 2020, and August 24, 2020, respectively, which meant that the parliamentary group would have been further reduced to six senators.

On November 14, 2019, Day announced that the Senate Liberal Caucus was disbanding, with its current complement of nine members forming a new non-partisan parliamentary group called the Progressive Senate Group (PSG). Unlike the Independent Senators Group and the Canadian Senators Group, which impose either prohibitions or limits, respectively, on outside partisan activities, there was no mention that the new Progressive Senate Group would have similar limits; however, Day confirmed that, like the aforementioned two groups, the PSG would not have whipped votes, and the requirements of membership included supporting or holding "progressive" political values, support of the Canadian Charter of Rights and Freedoms, and supporting a new relationship with Canada's Indigenous peoples. With the dissolution of the Senate Liberal Caucus, the Senate was without any Liberal senators for the first time in its history.

Leaders of the Senate Liberal Caucus

Membership

Members at dissolution

Former members

See also
 Canadian Senators Group
 Independent Senators Group
 Progressive Senate Group

Footnotes

References

External links
 

 
 
Liberal
Parliamentary groups in Canada
Liberal Party of Canada
41st Canadian Parliament
42nd Canadian Parliament
2014 establishments in Canada
Political organizations established in 2014
Organizations disestablished in 2019
2019 disestablishments in Canada